Willis House may refer to:

in the United States (by state then city)

Willis Fish Cabin at Bull Bay, Placida, Florida, listed on the National Register of Historic Places (NRHP) in Charlotte County

Fort-Hammond-Willis House, Milledgeville, Georgia, listed on the NRHP in Baldwin County
Willis-Sale-Stennett House, Danburg, Georgia, listed on the NRHP in Wilkes County
Jones-Willis House, Brandenburg, Kentucky, listed on the NRHP in Meade County
Mathias Willis Store House, Windyville, Kentucky, listed on the NRHP in Edmonson County
Stillman Willis House, Cambridge, Massachusetts, listed on the NRHP in Middlesex County
Joseph Willis House, Taunton, Massachusetts, listed on the NRHP in Bristol County
J. R. Willis House and La Miradora Apartments, Albuquerque, New Mexico, listed on the NRHP in Bernalillo County
Alexander Willis House, Coeymans, New York, listed on the NRHP in Albany County
Christopher Willis House, Dresden, New York, listed on the NRHP in Yates County, New York
Henry Willis House, Penland, North Carolina, listed on the NRHP in Mitchell County
Judge William R. Willis House, Roseburg, Oregon, listed on the NRHP in Douglas County
Willis House (York, Pennsylvania), listed on the NRHP in York County
Ashley-Willis House, Williston, South Carolina, listed on the NRHP in Barnwell County
Willis-Moody Mansion, Galveston, Texas, listed on the NRHP in Galveston County
Joseph S. Willis House, Park City, Utah, listed on the NRHP in Summit County
Willis House (Grand Encampment, Wyoming), listed on the NRHP in Carbon County

See also
Glen Willis (Franklin County, Kentucky), listed on the NRHP in Franklin County